The MGD PM-9 was a French open bolt submachine gun, designed in the late 1940s or early 1950s by Louis Debuit and manufactured in small numbers by French firm Merlin and Gerin in the 1950s. The PM9 was an unusual design in three different ways: it employed off-axis  delayed blowback, it had a clock-style spiral mainspring similar to that of the Lewis gun, rather than the cylindrically-coiled spring used in the vast majority of self-loading firearms and, most unconventionally of all, used a rotating flywheel as a delaying mass in conjunction with the bolt. It was furnished with a folding magazine, and some also had folding buttstocks, and this together with its original operating mechanism results in a highly compact weapon, but there is no known record of it being purchased or deployed by any military or police force.

See also

 Barnitzke machine gun
 Hotchkiss Type Universal
 KRISS Vector
 List of submachine guns

References

External links
Modern Firearms

Trial and research firearms of France
Delayed blowback firearms
Submachine guns of France
9mm Parabellum submachine guns